Mashhadi is of, or pertaining to, the Iranian city of Mashhad.

Mashhadi may also refer to:

Geography
 Mashhadi, Khuzestan
 Mashhadi Barag Jar
 Mashhadi Hoseyn
 Mashhadi Jafar
 Mashhadi Juzi
 Mashhadi Mohammad
 Qeshlaq-e Mashhadi Mohammad

People
 Mashhadi Jews
 Sultan Ali Mashhadi (1453-1520), Persian calligrapher and poet
 Tahir Hussain Mashhadi (b. 1942), Pakistani military officer